Balch may refer to:

People with the surname

Academics
Herbert E. Balch (1869–1958), British archaeologist and caver
Jennifer Balch American wildfire scientist
Pamela Balch, president of West Virginia Wesleyan College
Reg Balch (1894–1994), British Canadian photographer and scientist
Robert Balch (born 1945), American sociologist
Stephen Balch, American scholar
Thomas Balch (historian) (1821–1877), American historian

Military
George Beall Balch (1821–1908), American naval officer
John Henry Balch (1896–1980), US Navy
Joseph Pope Balch (1822–1872), American Civil War veteran of Rhode Island

Others
Albert V. Balch (1828–1915), American politician
Antony Balch (1937–1980), British film director
Emily Greene Balch (1867–1961), American pacifist and Nobel Peace Prize recipient
John Balch, builder of the John Balch House (1679), in Beverly, Massachusetts
Oscar B. Balch, American decorator who built the Oscar B. Balch House (1911) by Frank Lloyd Wright
Stephen Bloomer Balch (1747–1833), American Presbyterian minister

Places
Balch (crater), on Venus
Balkh, alternatively Balch, an ancient city in Afghanistan
Balch Cave in the Mendip Hills, Somerset, England
Balch Creek in Portland, Oregon
Balch Fieldhouse, arena in Boulder, Colorado
Balch Hall, at Cornell University
Balch House (Cincinnati, Ohio), a registered historic building
Balch Pond, on the Maine-New Hampshire border
Balch Springs, Texas

Vessels
USS Balch (DD-363)
USS Balch (DD-50)

Other uses
Balch & Bingham, a law firm in Birmingham, Alabama
Balch Institute for Ethnic Studies at the Historical Society of Pennsylvania in Philadelphia

See also
Balché, a mildly intoxicating Mayan drink